The following is the list of squads for each of the 16 teams competing in the EuroBasket 1993, held in Germany between 22 June and 4 July 1993. Each team selected a squad of 12 players for the tournament.

Group A

Bosnia and Herzegovina

Russia

Spain

Sweden

Group B

Bulgaria

Croatia

France

Turkey

Group C

Greece

Israel

Italy

Latvia

Group D

Belgium

Estonia

Germany

Slovenia

References
 1993 European Championship for Men, FIBA.com.
 European Championship 1993 - National Squads, LinguaSport.com.

1993